Psionex are a team of comic book supervillains and occasional anti-heroes in the Marvel Comics universe.

Publication history
Created by Fabian Nicieza and Mark Bagley, Psionex first appeared in The New Warriors #4.

Fictional character biography
Psionex are a group of artificially created superhumans who appeared as enemies of the New Warriors. The members are young people (assumed late teens to early twenties) altered by genetic, chemical, or biosurgical means by Harmon Furmintz of the Genetech Corporation to gain superpowers. They first battle the team of similarly aged heroes known as the New Warriors early in the latter team's career, but are soundly defeated and restrained.

They later violently attempt to escape Genetech's custody, feeling that they are little more than lab specimens, but are again opposed by the Warriors; this battle would lead to the rebirth of Terrax, a former herald of Galactus whose essence had been contained at Genetech. Mathemanic and Impulse volunteer to aid the Warriors against Terrax (Mathemanic out of altruism, Impulse out of battle lust), but both receive severe injuries in the fight; though Mathemanic recovers and returns to his studies of mathematics, Impulse's injuries require him to permanently use a wheelchair, and he is forced to retire his costumed identity.

The rest of Psionex escapes during the battle and go their separate ways. Warriors members Nova and Marvel Boy later check in on Pretty Persuasions at a New York City strip club, and Coronary would return to Genetech voluntarily for help in controlling his powers and possibly returning him to human form. Asylum struck out on her own, resurfacing in Central Park fighting Nova and two other Warriors, Firestar, and Speedball, a fight that ends with the female Asylum's disappearance.

Henrique Manuel Gallante, a drug-addicted mutant with powers allowing him to access the Darkforce dimension, takes the name Darkling. Driven mad by his abilities, he attacks New York. Several superheroes are able to convince Gallante to stop, and Gallante disappears into the Darkforce dimension. He later returns to Earth through Asylum's mask. He takes her name and regroups Psionex as "heroes" under his leadership, including Impulse, whose powers allowed his body to eventually heal its injuries. After an extended run of crime-fighting in which much excessive force is used to apprehend criminals, the team becomes wanted by the law after a boy dies in an encounter with Asylum, and Psionex is again opposed by the New Warriors. Though the death is ruled accidental (an undiagnosed heart condition determined as the cause), Asylum eventually takes responsibility and submits to police custody, while the rest of Psionex return to Genetech for observation. Mathemanic briefly makes trouble through good intentions, focusing so desperately on the desire to turn back time and prevent the boy's death that he affects the perception of time in the greater NYC area, making it seem that the boy's death and subsequent events had yet to occur. Comforted by the Warriors, Mathemanic accepts that he cannot undo what has already happened and consciously dispels his effect.

Psionex has not operated as their own team since the second Asylum's departure, though at least one member, Pretty Persuasions, has appeared out of Genetech's custody and at large (in the pages of New Thunderbolts, again employed as an exotic dancer).

During the Superhero Civil War, the individual members of Psionex (excepting either incarnation of Asylum) are apprehended by agents of the United States government who are enforcing the Superhuman Registration Act. They choose to join the Thunderbolts to avoid being jailed and are forced into a global conflict against the Grandmaster. Psionex later becomes the Initiative team for Maryland and sides with Norman Osborn during the Siege of Asgard. Osborn's forces are defeated and the Initiative purged of criminals.

Members
Pretty Persuasions - Heidi P. Franklin is an exotic dancer who received the ability to amplify the erotic urges of other people, and can manifest a psionic energy whip. She has a history of returning to her career as a dancer whenever Psionex has disbanded; thus she has above-average (though not superhuman) levels of agility and athletic ability maintained by such constant exercise.
Coronary - James Sharp is a medical student who became a bio-telepath, capable of inducing different bodily states on other people - vomiting, unconsciousness, etc. For some reason, his genetic alterations also gave his body a crystalline composition, which caused him to shatter when Namorita dropped him from a great height. He later reformed his body when he focused his power inward, allowing himself to control his own bodily state, including making himself intangible and having a minor ability to shapeshift. He can take a form that appears to be made up of jagged glass (this was once permanent, but he has since appeared in his original form). Coronary has gradually increased in size and mass since reforming his body; whether this translates into increased physical ability is unknown.
Mathemanic - Thomas Sorenson is a genius mathematician who received the ability to transmit mathematic figures telepathically, which can have various disabling effects. For example, he forces Firestar to perceive interstellar distances, which effectively rendered her unable to perceive smaller distances. He later turned this power inward, allowing him to make incredible calculations to perform feats that seemingly defied physics, such as manipulating gravity; he once subsconsciously affected the perception of the passage of time in a great number of people, in the futile pursuit of actually reversing time itself. Mathemanic is the least anti-social and criminally minded of the group, though he is somewhat absent-minded and distant in non-academic matters.
Impulse - Dwight Hubbard is a violent former gang member who was granted enhanced reflexes and speed. He wielded poisoned barbs on his gauntlets. He assisted the New Warriors in a battle solely for the violent thrill, but injuries sustained during the battle forced him into a hospital and a wheelchair. Over time, his enhanced metabolism led to a full recovery, and he rejoined Psionex when the team reformed under the second Asylum.
Asylum - The first Asylum was an unnamed mental patient who was imbued with Darkforce energies that converted her body into a psionic mist which caused hallucinations in anyone who touched it. She was later able to use her Darkforce energies as an offensive weapon. She was vulnerable at the one solid part of her body, a golden mask. After being defeated while fighting solo against the New Warriors Nova, Firestar and Speedball, she seemed to dissipate except for her mask, and has not been seen in action since.
Darkling / Asylum - Henrique Manuel Gallante was a drug addict who became mentally disturbed by his mutant ability to access the Darkforce Dimension, claiming that he heard a voice from within the Darkforce. While trying to control his energies, he inadvertently unleashed its powers into and amongst the people of New York City, including other superhumans whose powers were drawn from the Darkforce. Calling himself Darkling, he asserted enough control to face New York's resident superheroes, including members of the New Warriors, Avengers, and Fantastic Four, before ultimately choosing to spend time within the Darkforce Dimension alone to further develop his abilities. Later, Gallante returned to Earth using the original Asylum's mask, taking the identity for himself and reorganizing Psionex as its leader. After accidentally killing a young boy, he voluntarily submitted to police custody, and later to a mental institute to serve a term of undetermined length.

References

External links
 Psionex at Marvel Wiki
 Psionex at Comic Vine

Marvel Comics characters who have mental powers
Marvel Comics supervillain teams
Characters created by Fabian Nicieza